WKJQ-FM (97.3 FM, "Q97.3 FM") is a radio station broadcasting a country music format. Licensed to Parsons, Tennessee, United States, the station is currently owned by Clenney Broadcasting Corporation.

References

External links
 
 

Country radio stations in the United States
KJQ-FM
Decatur County, Tennessee